Hailufeng ( Hai Lok Hong), or in the language itself Haklau, is a variety of Chinese mostly spoken in the Hailufeng region of Guangdong. The region includes Shanwei (Swabue), which administratively includes Haifeng County (海丰 Hai Hong), and Lufeng City (陸丰 Lok Hong), which itself was a former county and now county-level city. The name 'Hailufeng' / 'Hai Lok Hong' (海陸丰) is a portmanteau of those places. It is a Southern Min (Min Nan) language with similarities to Hokkien, especially Chiangchew Hokkien, but since the Hailufeng region of Guangdong is part of the Teoswa region, it also has close geographical and cultural ties with neighboring Teochew. Ethnically, the Haklau see themselves as Hokkiens, separate from the Teochews. 

Differences from Teochew include the preservation of the final codas -t and -n, which are completely lost in Teochew, as well as the absence of the -oi finals.

References

Hokkien-language dialects
Shanwei
Southern Min